William Hugh Blanchard (February 6, 1916 – May 31, 1966) was a United States Air Force officer who attained the rank of four-star general and served as Vice Chief of Staff of the United States Air Force from 1965 to 1966.

Early life and education
A native of Boston, Massachusetts, Blanchard received his high school education in Chelsea, Massachusetts, and graduated from Phillips Exeter Academy before entering the United States Military Academy in 1934. He graduated and received his commission in 1938.

Career
After completing pilot training at Randolph and Kelly Fields, Texas, in 1939, he held assignments as a flight instructor and as chief of advanced pilot training in the Flying Training Command, before his selection in 1943 for duty with the initial B-29 bomber wing then being formed in Salina, Kansas.

In 1944, Blanchard, as deputy commander of the 58th Bomb Wing, flew the first B-29 into China to begin his participation in strategic bombing operations against the Japanese mainland. Later, assigned as commander of the 40th Bomb Group (B-29) and subsequently as operations officer of the 21st Bomber Command in the Marianas, he planned and flew low-level fire raids against major Japanese targets.

In the climaxing phase of World War II, then-colonel Blanchard was directed to prepare and supervise the detailed operations order for the delivery of the first atomic bomb on Hiroshima. He was the backup pilot for the Hiroshima A-bomb drop, which was ultimately delivered by Colonel Paul W. Tibbets, Commanding Officer of the 509th Atomic Bombardment Group or Wing.

After the war, on January 20, 1946, Blanchard became Commanding Officer of the 509th, succeeding Tibbetts.  By this time, post-war demobilization had reduced the 509th to a skeleton crew.  But Blanchard and the 509th were immediately ordered to commence operations for the "Operation Crossroads" atomic tests at Bikini atoll.  With highest priorities, crews were assembled and in March the 509th was transferred to Kwajalein, Marshall Islands, for the Bikini atomic bomb tests, that ultimately took place that July.

At the conclusion of the Crossroads tests, on August 23, 1946, then-colonel Blanchard assumed the duties of commanding officer of Roswell Army Air Field, New Mexico (renamed Walker Air Force Base in 1948), which became the permanent home of the 509th, though now again reduced to skeleton operations after the Crossroad tests.  However, in September 1946, they received orders to remain at Roswell and train and equip a very heavy bomber air force with nuclear strike capability, which became fully operational in February 1947.

On July 8, 1947, then-colonel Blanchard issued an official Army Air Force press release stating that the base intelligence office had recovered a so-called "flying disc" or "flying saucer" from a nearby ranch, it had been found "sometime last week," and they were flying it to "higher headquarters".  The press release and the media feeding frenzy that followed it triggered the so-called Roswell UFO incident.  Brigadier General Roger Ramey, head of the Eighth Army Air Force in Fort Worth, Texas, quickly pronounced it a misidentified weather balloon.  Ironically, Blanchard's press release and the Roswell incident it triggered are perhaps what Blanchard became best known for by the public at large decades later when the event was reopened and investigated, with many books written. (see also Walter Haut, Blanchard's public information officer, who put out the press release)

A year later, in 1948, Blanchard was assigned to Strategic Air Command's Eighth Air Force Headquarters in Fort Worth as director of operations. Blanchard helped direct the atomic training of crews for B-36s, the United States' first intercontinental bombers. After commanding B-50 and B-36 bomber units of SAC, he was assigned as deputy director of operations for that command in 1953.

In June 1956, he was a member of a group of U.S. Air Force officers who accompanied General Nathan Twining, then chief of staff of the U.S. Air Force, on an official visit to the Soviet Union which included a conducted tour of points of military interest in the Moscow and Stalingrad areas.

Blanchard assumed command of SAC's 7th Air Division in England in 1957. Returning to SAC headquarters three years later, he was assigned as director of operations.

After 15 years of continuous service in SAC, he was appointed Inspector General of the U.S. Air Force and promoted to the rank of lieutenant general. In August 1963 he was named deputy chief of staff, programs and requirements in Headquarters U.S. Air Force, and assumed the duty as deputy chief of staff, plans and operations, in February 1964. He was assigned the additional duty as senior Air Force member, Military Staff Committee of the United Nations, later that year.

On February 19, 1965, Blanchard became Vice Chief of Staff of the U.S. Air Force, with promotion to four-star rank.

Death
Blanchard died at the Pentagon on May 31, 1966, of a massive heart attack while still on active duty. He was buried on 3 June 1966 at the United States Air Force Academy Cemetery.  His wife, Anne (Hutt) Blanchard, his daughter, Mrs. Dale Brown, and sons William Hugh Blanchard II & Donald H. Blanchard attended the interment ceremony.  There is a building at Bolling Air Force Base named in his honor, as well as the golf course on Davis Monthan Air Force Base in Tucson, Arizona.

Awards and decorations
His decorations included the Air Force Distinguished Service Medal, the Silver Star, Legion of Merit with two oak leaf clusters, the Distinguished Flying Cross with oak leaf cluster, the Bronze Star, the Air Medal with oak leaf cluster, the Presidential Unit Citation, the Asiatic-Pacific Campaign Medal with six bronze stars, the Missile Badge and command pilot wings.

  Distinguished Service Medal
  Silver Star
  Legion of Merit with two oak leaf clusters
  Distinguished Flying Cross with oak leaf cluster
  Bronze Star
  Air Medal with oak leaf cluster
  Presidential Unit Citation
  Asiatic-Pacific Campaign Medal with six bronze stars

References

1916 births
1966 deaths
People from Boston
Recipients of the Air Medal
Recipients of the Distinguished Flying Cross (United States)
Recipients of the Air Force Distinguished Service Medal
Recipients of the Legion of Merit
Recipients of the Silver Star
United States Air Force generals
United States Military Academy alumni
United States Army Air Forces pilots of World War II
United States Army Air Forces officers
Vice Chiefs of Staff of the United States Air Force
United States Army colonels
Military personnel from Massachusetts